Victoria Despaigne is a retired Cuban heptathlete, long jumper and high jumper.

In the heptathlon she won the silver medal at the 1981 Central American and Caribbean Championships, the silver medal at the 1982 Central American and Caribbean Games and the gold medals at the 1983, 1985 and 1987 Central American and Caribbean Championships.

In the high jump she won the bronze medal at the 1983 Ibero-American Championships the gold medal at the 1983 Central American and Caribbean Championships and the bronze medal at the 1987 Central American and Caribbean Championships. In the long jump she won the bronze medal at the 1985 Central American and Caribbean Championships.

References

Year of birth missing (living people)
Living people
Cuban heptathletes
Cuban female long jumpers
Cuban female high jumpers
Competitors at the 1982 Central American and Caribbean Games
Athletes (track and field) at the 1983 Pan American Games
Central American and Caribbean Games silver medalists for Cuba
Central American and Caribbean Games medalists in athletics
Pan American Games competitors for Cuba
20th-century Cuban women
20th-century Cuban people